Ayele Mohamed (born 15 May 1950) is an Ethiopian boxer. He competed at the 1972 Summer Olympics and the 1980 Summer Olympics. At the 1972 Summer Olympics, he lost to Go Saeng-geun of South Korea.

References

1950 births
Living people
Ethiopian male boxers
Olympic boxers of Ethiopia
Boxers at the 1972 Summer Olympics
Boxers at the 1980 Summer Olympics
Place of birth missing (living people)
Bantamweight boxers